Raziabad (also Romanized as Raẕīābād and Razīābād; also known as Qal’eh-ye Zarābād) is a village in Dalfard Rural District, Sarduiyeh District, Jiroft County, Kerman Province, Iran. At the 2006 census, its population was 100, in 17 families.

References 

Populated places in Jiroft County